This is a list of statutes from 2017 to the present. For lists of earlier statutes, see Lists of Statutes of New Zealand.

This is a list of Statutes of New Zealand for the period of the Sixth Labour Government of New Zealand (2017–present).

2017

2018

2019

2020

2021

2022

References

External links 
The above list may not be current and will contain errors and omissions. For more accurate information see:
 New Zealand Legislation

Lists of statutes of New Zealand